Loafer's Lake is a lake in Brampton, Regional Municipality of Peel in Greater Toronto Area region of Ontario, Canada. It is in the Great Lakes Basin and lies on Etobicoke Creek.

The lake is part of Loafer's Lake Park, a Brampton municipal park, which also has a recreation centre with parking. The Etobicoke Creek Trail runs past the lake through the park. Loafer's Lake Recreation Center is located at 30 Loafer's Lake Lane.

References

Landforms of Brampton
Lakes of the Regional Municipality of Peel
Tourist attractions in Brampton